Ruggiero Boiardo (December 8, 1890 – October 29, 1984) was an Italian-American mobster in the New Jersey faction of the Genovese crime family.

Early life
Boiardo was born on December 8, 1890, in Naples, and was raised in the town of Marigliano. He was placed in an orphanage as a child. He later claimed that he was the illegitimate son of an Italian nobleman who was a descendant of Matteo Maria Boiardo. Boiardo later became known as "The Boot", a nickname which he developed in his youth, had been said to have derived from the heavy footed way he disposed of his gangland foes.

Criminal career
In the early 1930s, Boiardo was ambushed and seriously wounded with 12 buckshot pellet wounds. He survived. At the time, the press suspected Abner Zwillman was responsible, but later evidence pointed to the members of another rival gang led by the Mazzocchi brothers, whom the Boot subsequently had murdered. "None of Ritchie's gang is above suspicion of planning the murder of their leader," the Newark Evening News reported. "There are also said to be men who would like to see Ritchie out of the way because of certain women who favored him with their regard." Other likely suspects included the Mazzocchi brothers, Willie Moretti, and even his close friend Al Capone. The number-one suspect, however, was Abner “Longy” Zwillman, a man sometimes referred to as "gangster number two". When the Boot's thirty-eight-caliber revolver fell to the hospital floor, after the attempt on his life, prosecutors had a case against him. It was an unusual one that appeared to be putting the victim of a crime on trial, rather than the perpetrators. The men who tried to assassinate the Boot were never found, at least by the authorities. The police were convinced the Boot knew who was behind the shooting. In his hospital room they gave the seriously wounded gangster descriptions of the men who had allegedly shot at him, but the Boot shrugged and said he didn't know. In the 1930s, Boiardo became a made man, or full member of the Luciano crime family established by Lucky Luciano. In 1957, this family became the Genovese family under boss Vito Genovese. With Abe Zwillman's death in 1959, Boiardo became the undisputed mob boss of Newark, who also owned residences in Havana, Cuba and Florida, where he had major gambling interests.

In April 1969, Richie Boiardo was convicted of conspiracy to violate gambling laws. Accordingly, he was sentenced to two-and-a-half to three years in State Prison and fined $1,000. He was incarcerated on November 18, 1970 at the New Jersey State Prison, Leesburg, New Jersey. The Boiardo family's association with Newark's Mayor Hugh Addonizio led to Addonizio's conviction, in 1969, on racketeering charges. This eliminated Addonizio as a contender to become the next governor of the State of New Jersey. Addonizio was sentenced to ten years and served 5 years and 2 months in a federal prison. The same federal grand jury that returned an indictment against Addonizio, also indicted 14 others including Richie Boiardo's son Anthony Boiardo, also known as "Tony Boy" Boiardo.  The younger Boiardo is believed to have been in control of the Newark underworld at the time. During the criminal proceedings Tony Boy suffered a heart attack. He was never found by the courts to be healthy enough to stand trial on his extortion and conspiracy charges.

Death
Boiardo died of natural causes on October 29, 1984, aged 93, and was interred at Holy Cross Cemetery in North Arlington, New Jersey.

Boiardo's son, Anthony "Tony Boy" Boiardo (1918–1978), was also involved in organized crime. At the time of Anthony's death, he was awaiting trial on an indictment that had resulted in the conviction of Mayor of Newark, Hugh Joseph Addonizio.

Popular culture
David Chase, the creator of the HBO TV series The Sopranos, said the Soprano family was based on the Boiardo crime family, and their crews.
Richard Linnett's biography of Boiardo, In The Godfather Garden: The Long Life and Times of Richie the Boot Boiardo (2013), is based on archival material, classified and unclassified FBI and police files, interviews with Boiardo's family and friends, and the personal recollections of the Boot's grandson Roger Hanos.

References

Bibliography

Further reading

1890 births
1984 deaths
Genovese crime family
American gangsters of Italian descent
American people convicted of manslaughter
People from Livingston, New Jersey
Gangsters from Newark, New Jersey
Burials at Holy Cross Cemetery (North Arlington, New Jersey)
Italian emigrants to the United States